Hempstead Independent School District is a public school district  based in Hempstead, Texas (USA). The school district contains 3 schools and an early childhood learning center.

The district serves Hempstead and unincorporated areas in Waller County, including Monaville. Despite a small school population the district takes up a large amount of rural area.

In 2009, the school district was rated "academically acceptable" by the Texas Education Agency.

In the 2015-2016 school year, the school district had a very close call with being closed, and possibly Integrated with neighboring Waller ISD or Navasota ISD, but the district has since gotten back on its feet again.

Schools
Hempstead High (Grades 9-12)
Hempstead Middle (Grades 6-8)
Hempstead Elementary (Grades K-5)
Hempstead Early Childhood Center (Grades PK-3, PK-4)

As of 2014 360 students attend Hempstead Middle School, 54% of them being Hispanic.

References

External links
Hempstead ISD

School districts in Waller County, Texas